The Optical Society was a scientific society founded in London in 1899, which published Transactions of the Optical Society. 

The Optical Society was founded on 26 October 1899. The first president was W.H.E. Thornthwaite. The founders included Charles Algernon Parsons and Frank Twyman. Its meetings were mostly held at Imperial College London.

In 1932 it merged with the Physical Society of London, becoming the Optical Group of the Physical Society, and later the Optical Group of the Institute of Physics. The Optical Group is a member of the European Optical Society.

See also
Optical Society of America

References

External links
 Transactions of the Optical Society

Optics institutions
Scientific organizations established in 1899
Regional and local learned societies of the United Kingdom
Physics societies
1899 establishments in England
1932 disestablishments in England
Organizations disestablished in 1932
Clubs and societies in London
Science and technology in London